Parliamentary elections were held in Iraq on 24 March 1996. The elections were contested by 689 candidates, although 30 MPs were appointed to represent Iraqi Kurdistan. The result was a victory for the Ba'ath Party, which won 161 of the 250 seats. Voter turnout was reported to be 93.5%.

All candidates "had been approved beforehand by a committee chaired by the Justice Minister".

Results

References

Elections in Iraq
1996 elections in Iraq
Iraq
March 1996 events in Asia
Election and referendum articles with incomplete results